Ryan Campbell is a Canadian professional lacrosse player. He is currently the captain for the SouthWest Cyclops of the Canadian Lacrosse League (CLL).

Campbell played three games with the Edmonton Rush of the National Lacrosse League (NLL) during the 2009 season.

Awards and honours

References

Living people
Edmonton Rush players
Sportspeople from Brampton
Year of birth missing (living people)